National Highway 965DD, commonly referred to as NH 965DD is a national highway in India. It is a secondary route of primary National Highway 65.  NH-965DD runs in the state of Maharashtra in India.

Route 
NH965DD connects Lonand,  Andori, Shirwal, Bhor, Apti, Mahad, Mandangarh and Pacharal in the state of Maharashtra.

Junctions  
 
  Terminal near Lonand.
  near Shirwal
  near Mahad

See also 
 List of National Highways in India
 List of National Highways in India by state

References

External links 

 NH 965DD on OpenStreetMap

National highways in India
National Highways in Maharashtra